Pierrette Kombo (9 May 1939 – 29 June 2019) was a Congolese politician. In 1963 she was one of the first group of three women elected to the National Assembly alongside Micheline Golengo and Mambou Aimée Gnali.

Biography
Kombo was born Pierrette Loubaki in May 1939 in Bangui. She married Augustin Kombo.

An active member of the Revolutionary Union of the Women of Congo, she joined the National Movement of the Revolution (MNR) and was a candidate for the party in the 1963 parliamentary elections. With no opposition contesting the elections, she was elected to the National Assembly from the Brazzaville constituency, becoming one of the first group of three women to enter parliament.

She died in Saint-Herblain in France in June 2019.

References

1939 births
20th-century Republic of the Congo women politicians
20th-century Republic of the Congo politicians
Members of the National Assembly (Republic of the Congo)
National Movement of the Revolution politicians
2019 deaths